Camping is a six episode television series broadcast on Sky Atlantic between 12 April and 26 April 2016.

An American version based on the show was aired in 2018 on HBO, written by Lena Dunham and Jenni Konner.

Plot
A group of old friends go on a camping holiday in Devon to celebrate a landmark birthday. However, tensions and emotions quickly start to rise.

Cast
Oaklee Pendergast as Archie
Shaun Aylward as Davey
David Bamber as Noel
Steve Pemberton as Robin
Vicki Pepperdine as Fiona
Elizabeth Berrington as Kerry
Jonathan Cake as Adam
Julia Davis as Fay
Rufus Jones as Tom
Rhianna Merralls as Lisa
Daniel Barker as Darren
Nick Mohammed as Dr. Tolley
Stephen Evans as Antiques Shop Owner
Grace Hogg-Robinson as Catherine
Zack Momoh as Biggs

References

External links

 
 

2016 British television series debuts
2016 British television series endings
2010s British comedy television series
British comedy television shows
Sky Atlantic original programming
English-language television shows
Television shows set in Devon